Nearctic (February 11, 1954 – 27 July 1973) was a Canadian-bred Hall of Fame Thoroughbred racehorse.

Background
Bred by E. P. Taylor, he was out of the Irish mare Lady Angela, a daughter of the British Champion sire Hyperion. He was sired by the extremely important stallion Nearco.

Racing career
Conditioned for racing by future Canadian Hall of Fame trainer "Pete" McCann, Nearctic had his most successful season on the track at age four, when he won nine races and was voted Canadian Horse of the Year.

Stud record
Retired to stand at stud at Windfields Farm in Oshawa, Ontario. In 1967 he was syndicated for $1,050,000(US) and was moved to stand at Allaire du Pont's Woodstock Farm at Chesapeake City, Maryland. An outstanding stallion, Nearctic sired Kentucky Derby winner and the 20th century's greatest sire Northern Dancer. He also sired  Icecapade, Ice Water, Nonoalco, Northern Queen, and Canadian Hall of Fame inductee, Cool Reception.

Over and above the many highly successful sons of Northern Dancer, Nearctic was the grandsire of Northern Taste, Wild Again, Fanfreluche, Izvestia, and Son of Briartic, among others. He was also the damsire of Kennedy Road and the Canadian and U.S. Hall of Fame filly La Prevoyante.

Nearctic appears four generations back on both sides (dam and sire) of multiple graded stakes winning including Kentucky Derby champion thoroughbred race horse Big Brown.

Nearctic died at Woodstock Farm at age nineteen on July 27, 1973. He is buried in the farm's equine cemetery.

Pedigree

 Nearctic was inbred 4 x 4  to the stallion Chaucer, meaning that the latter appears twice in the fourth generation of his pedigree.

References

Bibliography
 Lennox, Muriel Anne, Dark Horse : Unravelling The Mystery Of Nearctic (1997) Beach House Books

External links
 Nearctic's pedigree and partial racing stats

1954 racehorse births
1973 racehorse deaths
Racehorses bred in Ontario
Racehorses trained in Canada
Du Pont racehorses
Canadian Thoroughbred Horse of the Year
Canadian Horse Racing Hall of Fame inductees
Thoroughbred family 14-c